The World's Religions, originally titled The Religions of Man, is a book written by religious studies scholar Huston Smith. The book was first published in 1958 and has been translated into twelve languages; it is "one of the most widely used college textbooks on comparative religion."

Summary
The book has ten chapters, the first being an introduction with the subsequent chapters covering Hinduism, Buddhism, Confucianism, Daoism, Islam, Judaism, Christianity and 'primal' religions (including Australian Aboriginal beliefs ). The final chapter discusses the relations between different religions.

Reviews
The book was reviewed in Kirkus Reviews and Publishers Weekly.

References

External links
Huston Smith official website

Books about religion
1958 non-fiction books